Bukosh may refer to:

Bukosh, Vushtrri, a village in the municipality of Vushtrri
, a village in the municipality of Suhareka

See also
Bukoš (disambiguation)